The Almond Tree may refer to:

 "The Almond Tree", a German fairy tale collected by the Brothers Grimm, more usually known as "The Juniper Tree" (fairy tale)
 The Almond Tree (John Ireland), a piece for piano solo of 1913 by John Ireland (18791962)

See also 
 Almond (disambiguation)